The Pittsburgh Penguins Radio Network is a radio network operated by the Pittsburgh Penguins of the National Hockey League that provides broadcasts for all the team's games. Josh Getzoff assumed play-by-play duties at the start of the 2021-22 season after the retirement of hall of fame announcer Mike Lange. Former Penguin Phil Bourque is the color commentator. The flagship station since 2006 is WXDX-FM in Pittsburgh.

Mike Lange began doing team radio broadcasts in 1974, and after not working for the team during the 1975–76 year, rejoined the network for the 1976–77 season. He provided play-by-play for radio as well as television when the team began simulcast broadcasts. When the two broadcasts separated in the mid-1990s, Lange worked exclusively on television for FSN Pittsburgh. In 2006, FSN did not renew Lange's contract, and he rejoined the radio network.

Paul Steigerwald worked with the team network from 1980 to 1999. He began with the team in 1980 performing interviews during intermissions. In 1984 he joined Lange as color analyst. When Lange moved to the television broadcast, Steigerwald became the play-by-play announcer. In 2006, Steigerwald replaced Lange at FSN, while Lange replaced Steigerwald on the radio network. Former Penguins Bob Errey served as color commentator following his retirement from playing in 1999. In 2003 when television broadcaster and former player Ed Olczyk became the team's head coach, Errey moved to television. Another former Penguin, Phil Bourque replaced Errey.

In October 2009 the team launched "Pittsburgh Penguins Radio" with WXDX-FM at 105.9 HD2. The station was the first exclusive HD station offered by an NHL team, and only the second among major league teams of any sport ("All Rams Radio" on KLOU-HD2 being the first however being disbanded in 2009). During the first season, content included "Penguins Live" with Steve Mears, a former New York Islanders play-by-play announcer, and Tom Grimm, a former WXDX host; a two-hour simulcast of XM Radio's "NHL Live"; and a one-hour show with WXDX host Mark Madden. The six hours of content was looped continuously, and the station also broadcasts all games. In addition to being available via an HD receiver, the station is also available at the Penguins website.                 The Stream ended in September 2015 and replaced on HD Radio by iHeart2000s

Affiliate stations

References

Pittsburgh Penguins
National Hockey League on the radio
Sports radio networks in the United States